Abu Geraniyeh-ye Do (also Romanized as Abū Gerānīyeh-ye Do; also known as Abū Gereyneh, Abū Gereyneh-ye Do, and Abū Gereynīyeh-ye Do) is a village in Shoaybiyeh-ye Sharqi Rural District, Shadravan District, Shushtar County, Khuzestan Province, Iran. At the 2006 census, its population was 76, in 13 families.

References 

Populated places in Shushtar County